The women's 81 kg competition at the 2019 World Weightlifting Championships was held on 25 September 2019.

Schedule

Medalists

Records

Results

References

Results 

Women's 81 kg
2019 in women's weightlifting